Constant ("Stan") Ockers (3 February 1920 in Borgerhout – 1 October 1956 in Antwerp) was a Belgian professional racing cyclist.

He was runner-up in the Tour de France in 1950 and 1952, and the best sprinter in that race in 1955 and 1956.  In 1955 he won the Classic "Ardennes double" by winning La Flèche Wallonne and the Liège–Bastogne–Liège in the same year.  At this time the races were run on successive days as "Le Weekend Ardennais". He also won the World Cycling Championship that year.

Stan Ockers died after crashing during a track race in Antwerp in 1956. A year later a monument was built in Les Forges, Sprimont, in the south of Belgium.

Career achievements

Major results

1941
 1st Scheldeprijs
1943
 3rd Liège–Bastogne–Liège
1944
 4th Overall Omloop van België
1946
 1st Scheldeprijs
 1st Heist-op-den-Berg
 1st Bruxelles–Saint-Trond
 5th Gent–Wevelgem
1947
 3rd Overall Tour de Suisse
 4th La Flèche Wallonne
 5th Liège–Bastogne–Liège
 6th Overall Tour de Luxembourg
1948
 1st  Overall Tour of Belgium
 2nd Omloop der Vlaamse Ardennen
 2nd Dwars door West-Vlaanderen
1949
 7th Overall Tour de France
1950
 2nd Overall Tour de France
1st Stage 4
 2nd Critérium des As
 7th Road race, UCI World Road Championships
 8th Overall Challenge Desgrange-Colombo
1951
 5th Overall Tour de France
 6th Bordeaux–Paris
1952
 2nd Overall Tour de France
 2nd Overall Roma–Napoli–Roma
1st Stage 4a
 2nd Overall Vuelta a Argentina
1st Stage 3
 2nd La Flèche Wallonne
 3rd Overall Challenge Desgrange-Colombo
 6th Overall Giro d'Italia
 10th Road race, UCI World Road Championships
1953
 1st La Flèche Wallonne
 2nd Overall Roma–Napoli–Roma
1st Stage 4
 2nd Critérium des As
 2nd Overall Week-end ardennais
 3rd  Road race, UCI World Road Championships
 3rd Road race, National Road Championships
 3rd Overall Challenge Desgrange-Colombo
 4th Giro di Lombardia
 4th Bordeaux–Paris
 6th Overall Giro d'Italia
1954
 1st Schaal Sels
 2nd Paris–Roubaix
 5th Bordeaux–Paris
 6th Overall Tour de France
1st Stage 11
 6th Milan–San Remo
1955
 1st  Road race, UCI World Road Championships
 1st Overall Challenge Desgrange-Colombo
 1st Overall Week-end ardennais
 1st La Flèche Wallonne
 1st Liège–Bastogne–Liège
 1st Trophée Gentil
 1st Stage 1b (TTT) Driedaagse van Antwerpen
 2nd Overall Tour de Suisse
 2nd Grand Prix Martini
 2nd De Drie Zustersteden
 2nd Bruxelles–Couvin
 3rd Critérium des As
 5th Paris–Brussels
 8th Overall Tour de France
1st  Points classification
 9th Paris–Tours
1956
 1st  Overall Roma–Napoli–Roma
1st Stages 1b, 3b, 4b, 5a & 5b
 2nd Tour of Flanders
 2nd Bordeaux–Paris
 2nd Grand Prix Martini
 3rd Overall Challenge Desgrange-Colombo
 4th Road race, UCI World Road Championships
 4th La Flèche Wallonne
 6th Gent–Wevelgem
 8th Overall Tour de France
1st  Points classification
1st Stage 19
 9th Overall Critérium du Dauphiné Libéré
1st Stages 5 & 9
 10th Milan–San Remo

Grand Tour general classification results timeline

Awards and honours 

 Trophée Edmond Gentil: 1955
 Memorial monument in Sprimont, Liège (la Côte des Forges): 1957
 Introduced in the UCI Hall of Fame: 2002
 Memoire du Cyclisme - Ranking of the Greatest Cyclists (44th place): 2002
 Commemorative plaque in Borgerhout, Antwerp: 2006
 CyclingRanking - Overall all time ranking (43th place): 2022

References

External links

1920 births
1956 deaths
Belgian male cyclists
Belgian Tour de France stage winners
UCI Road World Champions (elite men)
Cyclists who died while racing
Sport deaths in Belgium
People from Borgerhout
Cyclists from Antwerp
Challenge Desgrange-Colombo winners